This is a list of musical artists who pertain to the dark cabaret genre.

A

Abby Travis
Alu
Amanda Palmer
Andi Sexgang
Antony and the Johnsons
Aurelio Voltaire
American Murder Song

B

Baby Dee
Battle Circus
Beat Circus
The Birthday Massacre
Birdeatsbaby
Bitter Ruin
Black Tape For A Blue Girl

C

Charming Hostess
Christian Death
Circus Contraption
Czesław Śpiewa

D

Dakh Daughters
The Dresden Dolls (Amanda Palmer and Brian Viglione)

E

Emilie Autumn
Evelyn Evelyn

F

Fantasmagoria
Friendly Rich

G

Gaba Kulka
Gitane Demone

H

Hannah Fury
H.U.M.A.N.W.I.N.E.

I

Insomniac Folklore
IAMX

J

Jason Webley
Jill Tracy
Johnny Hollow 
The Jane Austen Argument

K

Kabaret Sybarit
Kaizers Orchestra
Katzenjammer Kabarett
Klaus Nomi
The Kransky Sisters

L

Little Annie
Lonely Drifter Karen
Lola Blanc

M

Majandra Delfino
Man Man
Marc Almond (also Marc & The Mambas)
Marcella and the Forget-Me-Nots
Meow Meow
Meret Becker
Momus

N

Nina Hagen

P

Pretty Balanced
Puerto Muerto

R

Rasputina
The Romanovs
Rosin Coven
Rozz Williams

S

Sex Gang Children
Spiritual Front
Stolen Babies
Sxip Shirey

T

The Tempers
The Tiger Lillies
Tom Waits

V

Vermillion Lies
Veronique Chevalier

W

The World/Inferno Friendship Society

Will Wood and the Tapeworms

References

Lists of punk bands
Gothic rock musicians